Leo Dennis Grills OAM (26 May 1928 – 27 July 2007) professionally billed as Lucky Grills, was an Australian actor and comedian. His best known acting role was in the crime drama TV series Bluey playing the title role. Grills took his professionally working name after the Italian-American gangster Lucky Luciano.

Grills is credited for initiating the Mo Awards, an awards show that celebrate Australian Variety in 1975.

Early life and career 
Born in Johnson St. Moonah, Tasmania, to Francis Leonard Grills and Hilda May (née Dennis) and was the youngest of four sibling, who were Thelda Jean Grills, Raymond Ernest, Eunice and Faye Grills. He was best known for portraying the title role of unconventional detective "Bluey" Hills in the television series Bluey in 1976.

Prior to Bluey, he worked as a stand-up comic in the Sydney clubs. He would change his material to suit his audience, stating: "Some people know me as the dirtiest comic in the business... but others know me as a man who never drops even a mild four-letter word."

One time in Adelaide, Grills had done a show and needed to get a taxi. He had put on a big houndstooth-checked sports jacket and was carrying a suitcase. The taxi driver looked at him and asked where he had been wrestling. Lucky had to set him straight and let him know he was not a wrestler but a comic. For the rest of the journey, Grills had to listen to the cabbie telling old jokes.

He also did three hundred weeks in a migrant education programme called You say the Word, where he played the owner of a factory. "It was designed to show newcomers to Australia how things were done and to teach them English", he explained.

Prior to Bluey, he played other parts in Crawford shows but "oddly enough, despite my bulk and appearance, never once have I been asked to play a heavy".

It was a guest role in one of those shows - Matlock Police - that brought him to the attention of producers for the role of Bluey. He was sent a script page, read it and duly went to the audition. Within ten days he knew he had the part.

He was reintroduced to a younger generation in a recurring segment of the early-1990s comedy series The Late Show called Bargearse, a humorous re-dub of Bluey.

Grills also made three in-person appearances on the show, including singing as a member of a Crosby, Stills, Nash & Young parody band and in character as Bluey protesting the last episode of Bargearse.

Honours 
He was awarded the Australian Centenary Medal in the 2000 Queen's New Year's Honours List for his services to the entertainment industry and the arts. He was also awarded the Medal of the Order of Australia (OAM) in the 2001 Queen's Birthday Honours List for his services to the entertainment industry through charitable organisations.

Death 
Grills died in his sleep in Queensland. On the day prior to his death he was still working and had made two public appearances back to back. His cremated remains were later interred in the Cheltenham Memorial Park (Wangara Road), Melbourne on 19 December 2007.

Select credits
Home and Away (1991)
Vietnam (1987)
People Like Us (1980)
Money Movers (1978)
Bluey (1976-1977)
''Caddie (1976)

References

External links
 
 Friends of Cheltenham and Regional Cemeteries Inc.

1928 births
2007 deaths
Australian male television actors
Australian male comedians
Male actors from Hobart
20th-century Australian comedians
Recipients of the Medal of the Order of Australia
Recipients of the Centenary Medal